Stephen Hero is a posthumously published autobiographical novel by Irish author James Joyce. Its published form reflects only a portion of an original manuscript, part of which was lost. Many of its ideas were used in composing A Portrait of the Artist as a Young Man.

Background
Work on Stephen Hero probably began in Dublin in 1903. According to Derek Attridge, it was to be "a thinly disguised autobiography, stylistically undistinguished and immensely long."

Joyce abandoned the work in Trieste in 1905.

References

Further reading

Walbank, Alan (1965). "Stephen Hero's Bookshops." The Book Collector 14 no 2 (summer): 194-199.

1944 novels
Novels by James Joyce
Unfinished novels
Irish bildungsromans
Novels published posthumously
Jonathan Cape books
Novels set in Ireland